"Mile High" is a song by English singer-songwriter and electronic music producer James Blake, featuring American rapper and singer Travis Scott and American hip hop producer Metro Boomin, released on 17 January 2019 through Polydor Records as the second single from the former's fourth studio album, Assume Form (2019). It was written by the trio, with production helmed by Blake alongside Metro Boomin, Dre Moon and Wavey.

Musically, "Mile High" is a trap track which features influences from each artist's musical style. Following the track's premiere on Zane Lowe's Beats 1 show as that day's "World Record", the track was met with positive reviews from music critics, with most praising the three artists' chemistry.

In 2020, New Zealand singer Benee covered the song for Australian youth broadcaster Triple J's segment Like a Version.

Background and recording
In an interview with Zane Lowe of Beats 1, James Blake revealed that the song was created during a recording session that was not initially meant to have anything to do with the album Assume Form. He was listening to Travis Scott singing over Metro Boomin's beat when, impressed, he asked to sing over it. He hailed Scott as "exceptionally talented at melodies" in an interview with Apple Music and also told Dazed that he was impressed at Scott's musical range, saying "he'd just released Astroworld, which is like banger after banger, and then he comes and does this really vulnerable, sweet love song." Blake also praised Metro Boomin, saying "the beat is a huge part of why that track feels the way it does."

Composition
"Mile High" has been described as "a slow-burning soul trap banger" with "the signature Travis Scott bass hits and murky, rainy-weather James Blake mood." Rolling Stone noted that the track features "more of Blake’s DNA than his collaborators’", adding that the track "is an exercise in restraint." Conversely, Spin described it as "a quieter, dispassionate version of [...] most Travis Scott music." MTV noted that Scott "and his blunt rhymes [...] are balanced by Blake's gentle crooning." Vocally, the two artists' vocals range from a deep tone to a falsetto.

Release and reception
The song was released just twelve hours prior to the release of Assume Form through Polydor Records. It premiered on Zane Lowe's Beats 1 show, where Lowe reportedly played the song three times over and said "James Blake, you’ve done it again."

"Mile High" was met with positive reviews from music critics, most praising the three artists' chemistry. Consequence of Sound deemed it the best track of the week, writing that it "proves that Scott can fit in on more than just his signature bangers, with an almost comforting delivery that’s more inviting than assertive." Stereogum gave it the same accolade, noting that "There’s a stuttering sample of something — a flute maybe? — that echoes like a birdcall through a rainforest. It’s lovely." Raisa Bruner featured it on Time'''s "5 Songs You Need to Listen to This Week" list, calling it "a love song [...] but also a flex — not just in terms of lyrical content, but also in terms of just how understated Blake can be." Robert Marshall of Hypebeast hailed the track as " perfect marriage of the trio’s distinct sounds, while also proving Blake’s sonic progression." Ben Devlin of MusicOMH echoed these views, writing that "it shows remarkable chemistry."

Music video
A music video for "Mile High" was released on 3 February 2019, just hours before Scott's performance at the Super Bowl Halftime Show, and had previously been teased on Blake's social media. It was directed by Nabil and is set at and filmed in the Mile High Cafe in Idyllwild, California. The visual has been compared by Rolling Stone and HotNewHipHop to the "sunken place" scene in the 2017 horror film Get Out. The video begins with Blake sitting in the Mile High Cafe with a cup of tea before Scott bangs on the cafe's window to gain his attention. Scott then sits down at Blake's table and discusses the colour of the sky and the idea of not owning a cell phone. While stirring his tea, Blake drifts off to a dark dreamworld inside his mind and begins to perform the song with Scott. Meanwhile, Scott tries to regain Blake's attention in the real world.

Charts

Weekly charts

Year-end charts

Benee version
On 31 January 2020, New Zealand singer Benee featured on Australian youth broadcaster Triple J's segment Like a Version'', where she performed a cover of the song, in addition to a performance of "Glitter".

References

2019 singles
2019 songs
James Blake (musician) songs
Benee songs
Polydor Records singles
Songs written by James Blake (musician)
Songs written by Metro Boomin
Songs written by Travis Scott
Trap music songs